Since assuming office in May 2019, Volodymyr Zelenskyy has made several international trips in his capacity as the president of Ukraine.

Summary

2019

2020

2021

2022

2023

Future visits

Canceled visits

Gallery

References

External links
 President of Ukraine, official website News - Current Events
 President of Ukraine, official website Photo gallery - Foreign visits

 
2019 in international relations
Lists of 21st-century trips
State visits by Ukrainian leaders
Ukraine diplomacy-related lists
Diplomatic visits by heads of state